Trading with the Enemy is the second album by the collaborative band Tuatara, released in 1998. Steve Berlin and Scott McCaughey were among the new musicians who contributed to the album.

Critical reception
Guitar Player noted that "traces of jazz, afro-pop, and the Starsky & Hutch theme seep through the layers of guitars, saxophones, and vibraphones." The Windsor Star praised the "Ventures-influenced surf tune ('Afterburner'), a funky tribute to deceased Nigerian musician/activist Fela Kuti ('Fela the Conqueror') and an idyllic folk tune that is propelled by Buck's mandolin ('Angel and the Ass')."

Track listing
"The Streets of New Delhi" (Justin Harwood and Barrett Martin) - 5:05
"Smuggler's Cove" (Martin, Skerik, and Mike Stone) - 5:42
"Night in the Emerald City" (Harwood and Martin) - 7:32
"The Bender" (Harwood, Martin, and Skerik) - 5:13
"Negotiation" (Steve Berlin, Peter Buck, Harwood, Martin, Scott McCaughey, Skerik, and Stone) - 3:21
"Fela the Conqueror" (Harwood, Martin, and Skerik) - 6:11
"Wormwood" (Berlin, Harwood, Martin, and Skerik) - 5:34
"Koto Song (The Old Shinjuku Trail)" (Berlin, Martin, and McCaughey) - 6:34
"L' Espionnage Pomme de Terre Buck" (Buck, Harwood, Martin, McCaughey, and Skerik) - 6:26
"Angel and the Ass" (Buck, Harwood, and Martin) -  3:14
"P.C.H." (Buck, Harwood, and Martin) - 3:24
"Afterburner" (Harwood, Martin, and Skerik) - 7:49

Personnel
Steve Berlin
Peter Buck
Craig Flory
Justin Harwood
Barrett Martin
Scott McCaughey
Elizabeth Pupo-Walker
Skerik
Mike Stone

References

1998 albums
Epic Records albums
Tuatara (band) albums